Neven Laštro (born 1 October 1988 in Bosnia and Herzegovina) is a Bosnian footballer who now plays for Sesvete in the Croatian Second Football League.

Club career
Lastro started his senior career with NK Kresevo-Stanic. After that, he played for ASKÖ Gmünd, HNK Suhopolje, NK Pitomača, NK Travnik, NK Široki Brijeg, NK Osijek, HŠK Zrinjski Mostar, and FK Mladost Doboj Kakanj. In 2019, he signed for CLB Than Quảng Ninh in the Vietnamese V.League 1, where he has made twenty-six league appearances and scored one goal.

References

External links
 
 From the BiH Premier League to Vietnam: "Stress is never less, but when I saw that they eat dogs..."
 The Croat almost became sick: 'When I saw that they were baking a dog, I almost vomited' 
 Neven Lastro: "Football is love; the greatest happiness is doing the job you love" 
 Lastro: Expectations are high, I hope for a new title!

1988 births
Living people
Sportspeople from Zenica
Association football defenders
Bosnia and Herzegovina footballers
HNK Suhopolje players
NK Travnik players
NK Široki Brijeg players
NK Osijek players
HŠK Zrinjski Mostar players
FK Mladost Doboj Kakanj players
Than Quang Ninh FC players
NK Karlovac players
NK Sesvete players
Austrian 2. Landesliga players
Premier League of Bosnia and Herzegovina players
Croatian Football League players
V.League 1 players
First Football League (Croatia) players
Second Football League (Croatia) players
Bosnia and Herzegovina expatriate footballers
Expatriate footballers in Austria
Bosnia and Herzegovina expatriate sportspeople in Austria
Expatriate footballers in Croatia
Bosnia and Herzegovina expatriate sportspeople in Croatia
Expatriate footballers in Vietnam